The White Moor is a 1965 Romanian fantasy film directed by Ion Popescu-Gopo. It was entered into the 4th Moscow International Film Festival where Popescu-Gopo won the award for Best Director.
The film is based on the fairy tale The Story of Harap Alb by Romanian writer Ion Creangă.

Taken from an old fairy tale. White Moor is the prince who is second in line to the throne. After the king sends him to visit his uncle, the prince meets various memorable people and is captured by a bad guy who assumes his identity and forces him to become a slave.

Cast
 Florin Piersic as Harap-Alb
 Emil Botta as Roșu Împarat
 Fory Etterle as Verde Împarat
 George Demetru as Alb Împarat
 Chris Avram as Spânul
 Liliana Tomescu as Ochilă
 Florin Vasiliu as Setilă
 Puiu Călinescu as Gerilă
 Mircea Bogdan as Flămânzilă
 Viorel Manta as Păsărilă

References

External links
 

1965 films
1960s fantasy films
1960s Romanian-language films
Romanian fantasy films
Films directed by Ion Popescu-Gopo
Romanian children's films